The Lahad Datu District is an administrative district in the Malaysian state of Sabah, part of the Tawau Division which includes the districts of Kunak, Lahad Datu, Semporna and Tawau. The capital of the district is in Lahad Datu Town.

Etymology 
The word "Lahad Datu" comes from the Bajau language, "Lahad" means the place and "Datu" means the dignity of certain people during the sultanate era. The place name traced its roots from the migration of Datu-datu from the Sultanate of Sulu led by Datu Puti as a result of the handing over this area by the Sultanate of Brunei to Sulu after the Brunei Civil War.

History 

Following the acquisition of this area by the North Borneo Chartered Company, the Lahad Datu District was established and it subsequently became the major producer of tobacco for the company beside coconut plantation to produce copra.

On 11 February 2013, several armed Filipino supporters of the Sultanate of Sulu, calling themselves the Royal Security Forces of the Sultanate of Sulu and North Borneo, arrived in Lahad Datu district and occupied the village of Tanduo. They were sent by Jamalul Kiram III, a claimant to the throne of the sultanate. His stated goal is to assert the Philippine territorial claim to eastern Sabah as part of the North Borneo dispute. In response, Malaysian security forces surrounded the village. After several negotiations with the group by the Philippine and Malaysian governments to reach a peaceful solution were unsuccessful, the standoff escalated into an armed conflict which ended with 56 followers of the self-proclaimed Sultanate dead and the others captured by the Malaysian authorities. The Malaysian side also suffered 10 lives lost during the conflict, along with an additional six civilians.

Demographics 

According to the last census in 2010, the population of Lahad Datu district is estimated to be around 199,830 inhabitants. As in other districts of Sabah, there are a significant number of illegal immigrants from the nearby southern Philippines, mainly from the Sulu Archipelago and Mindanao, many of whom are not included in the population statistics. The population of the district is divided among the larger communities and the total area of the district as follows:

Tourism 
The district has several tourist attractions, including Danum Valley Conservation Area, Tabin Wildlife Reserve and the Madai Cave.

Gallery

See also 
 Districts of Malaysia

References

Further reading

External links 

  Lahad Datu District Council
  Lahad Datu District Office